Ryan Brownlee in an American college baseball coach and former second baseman. He played four seasons under his father Jim at Evansville before a single season with the Independent Evansville Otters. He coached two seasons with the Purple Aces before moving to James Madison in 2000, where he remained for four seasons. Brownlee moved to Iowa in 2004, and added recruiting coordinator duties during his nine seasons with the Hawkeyes. During that time, 32 players he recruited or coached were drafted by Major League teams. In September 2012, he was named to his first head coaching position with the Western Illinois Leathernecks baseball program. He then served as the head coach of the Western Illinois Leathernecks.

Head coaching record

See also
 List of current NCAA Division I baseball coaches

References

External links

Living people
1976 births
Sportspeople from Evansville, Indiana
Evansville Otters players
Evansville Purple Aces baseball coaches
Evansville Purple Aces baseball players
Iowa Hawkeyes baseball coaches
James Madison Dukes baseball coaches
Western Illinois Leathernecks baseball coaches
Educators from Indiana